Lewis A. Roney (July 7, 1922 – September 28, 2004) was an American college basketball player.  He was a starting guard for the Wyoming Cowboys' 1943 National Championship team and later a teacher and coach.

Roney, a 6'3 guard who grew up on a dairy farm in Powell, Wyoming, played for the Cowboys from 1941 to 1943, then returned to the Cowboys for the 1946–47 season after a stint in the United States Navy during World War II.  Roney served in the Pacific for his World War II tour of duty.  During the Cowboys' championship year, coach Everett Shelton credited the insertion of the energetic Roney into the starting lineup as one of the keys to the team's success that year.

After the close of his collegiate career, Roney became a teacher and coach in Laramie, Wyoming.  His son, Lew played basketball at Yale, where he earned a BS in engineering, and then earned a masters math at Wyoming, before moving to Cheyenne and becoming a coach and math instructor at Cheyenne Central High School.  His father, Lew Roney was inducted into the University of Wyoming athletics hall of fame as a member of the 1943 national championship team in 1993.

References

1922 births
2004 deaths
American men's basketball players
United States Navy personnel of World War II
Basketball players from Wyoming
Guards (basketball)
High school basketball coaches in Wyoming
High school football coaches in Wyoming
People from Powell, Wyoming
Wyoming Cowboys basketball players